The Ministry of Environment and Water (KVVM) was a government ministry of Hungary from 1988 to 1990, and again from 2002 to 2011. Between 1990 and 2002 the water functions were under the Ministry of Transport, Communication and Water; environmental responsibilies continued under the Ministry for Environment Protection, then from October 1990 to 1998 as the Ministry of Environment and Regional Development, then from 1998 to 2002 as the Ministry of Environment Protection.

History
In April 1988 the Ministry of Environment and Water was established through a merger of the National Water Bureau and the National Environment and Nature Protection Office. In July 1990, the Ministry of Transport, Communication and Water assumed the responsibility of water affairs, taking it from the Ministry of Environment and Water, which changed its name to Ministry for Environment Protection and kept that name for several months. It later became known as the Ministry of Environment and Regional Development. In 1998 the Ministry of Environment Protection was established after another reorganization occurred in the governmental ministries.

In 2002 the responsibility of water affairs was transferred from the Ministry for Transport, Communication and Water to the Ministry of Environment Protection, which again became the Ministry of Environment and Water. The ministry was abolished in 2010 and the Ministry of Agriculture now handles the responsibilities formerly held by the Ministry of Environment and Water.

References

External links

 Ministry of Environment and Water (Archive)
  Ministry of Environment and Water (Archive)

Environment and Water
Environment ministries
Water ministries
Defunct environmental agencies